Abderrahman Ben Azzedine (born 25 December 1933) is a Tunisian footballer. He competed in the men's tournament at the 1960 Summer Olympics.

References

External links
 

1933 births
Living people
Tunisian footballers
Tunisia international footballers
Olympic footballers of Tunisia
Footballers at the 1960 Summer Olympics
Footballers from Tunis
Association football forwards